Fishhawk Glacier is located in the Absaroka Range, Shoshone National Forest, in the U.S. state of Wyoming. The glacier is situated on the northeast slope of Overlook Mountain and is one of but a few glaciers that can be found in the Absaroka Range.

See also
List of glaciers in the United States

References

Glaciers of Wyoming
Glaciers of Park County, Wyoming